The New World of Leonard Nimoy is the fifth and final album of Leonard Nimoy. Dot Records released the album in June 1970.

Background
Unlike the four previous albums, there was no production input from Charles R. Grean or George Tipton. Instead, the production was provided by a crew of different producers, arrangers, and engineers who gave the album a country sound. Nevertheless, the album featured Nimoy's theme of songs about the human condition, love, and people living together in the world.

Track listing

Side one
 "Time To Get It Together" (Smokey Roberds)
 "Ruby, Don't Take Your Love to Town" (Mel Tillis)
 "The Mayor of Ma's Cafe" (Paul Hampton)
 "I Walk the Line" (Johnny Cash)
 "I Finally Saw the Two of You Today" (Bruce Belland, David Somerville)
 "Mary's Near" (Allen Wayne, Henry Capps)

Side two
 "Abraham, Martin and John" (Dick Holler)
 "Proud Mary" (John Fogerty)
 "Let it Be Me" (Gilbert Bécaud, Pierre Delanoë)
 "Everybody's Talkin'" (Fred Neil)
 "The Sun Will Rise" (Leonard Nimoy)
 "Put a Little Love in Your Heart" (Jackie DeShannon, Randy James Myers, James E. Holiday)

Production
Produced by Steve Clark
Arranged by Ben Benay except "The Mayor Of Ma's Cafe," "Proud Mary," "The Sun Will Rise," and "Put A Little Love In Your Heart" by Mike Henderson
Recorded at Harmony Recorders, Hollywood, California

References

External links
Review of New World of Leonard Nimoy at maidenwine.com, a detailed Leonard Nimoy fan site.

Leonard Nimoy albums
1970 albums
Folk albums by American artists
Country albums by American artists